Franklin Gómez Matos (born August 5, 1986) is a Dominican-born Puerto Rican freestyle wrestler.

Early years and education
Gómez was born in Puerto Plata Province in the Dominican Republic. His father, Eugenio Gómez, was a fisherman and his mother, Margarita Matos, was a housewife. In 1991, Franklin's father died as a consequence of medical malpractice. As a result, his mother decided to move to Puerto Rico, along with Franklin and her other two sons: Emanuel and Abel.

During childhood, Gómez played basketball and baseball. He began wrestling when he was 12 years old, training at Club Sparta in San Juan. He came to New Jersey his freshman year of high school where he stayed with a host family, Bill and Diane McGrath, in Hammonton, New Jersey and attended St. Augustine Preparatory School in Richland, New Jersey. Aside of wrestling, Gómez completed a Bachelor's degree in Human Resources, with a major in Psychology from Michigan State, as well as a Master's degree in Business Administration from Walden University.

Wrestling career 
While studying at St. Augustine Prep in New Jersey, Gómez won district and regional titles at 103 and 112 lbs. He wrestled at Brandon High School in Brandon, Florida and won a state title at 119 lb his senior year. Gómez also wrestled for Michigan State and won an NCAA Division I title at 133 pounds in 2009. After graduation, he was recruited to Penn State University and trains freestyle wrestling at the Nittany Lion Wrestling Club.

During the 2011 Pan American Games in Guadalajara, Mexico, Gómez won the first gold medal in the sport of wrestling for Puerto Rico. He has won his last three tournaments in Romania, Italy and Germany. In his last performance, he defeated the current world champion in the 60 kg, the Russian wrestler Besik Kudukhov, claiming the gold medal in the Grand Prix of Germany. After becoming the sub-champion and winning a silver medal in the 2011 World Championships, Gomez also won his country a spot at the 2012 London Olympics.

At the 2012 Olympics in London, Gómez faced Besik Kudukhov of Russia again but this time in the first round. Kudukhov defeated Gomez 3–1 and made the final but was defeated by Toghrul Asgarov of Azerbaijan. With Kudukhov making the final, Gomez was made eligible to wrestle for a medal in the repechage rounds. Gómez fought against Yogeshwar Dutt in the repechage rounds, but lost again 0–3, and Dutt eventually claimed the bronze medal.

At the 2014 World Wrestling Championships in the round of 16 he lost to Soslan Ramonov (by fall) of Russia and in the repechage round 2 he lost again to Ganzorigiin Mandakhnaran of Mongolia (4–7)

At the 2016 Olympics in Rio de Janeiro, Brazil, Gómez faced Ikhtiyor Navruzov of Uzbekistan. Gómez and Navruzov were tied 5–5 in the second round. As the match was about to end, Gómez made a move that took Navruzov outside of the ring, initially warranting two points for Gómez. However, one of the officers argued that the move favored Navruzov, forcing Gómez' corner to challenge the call. When the officers decided against him, the bout ended 8–5 against Gómez.

The decision was controversial from the beginning, with various experts and sources calling the decision "insane", and saying that Gómez was "robbed" on Twitter. Some notable wrestlers and coaches that tweeted in support of Gómez were Eric Thompson, Jake Varner, Cael Sanderson, Mark Hemauer, and Ben Askren. Former Governor of Puerto Rico Aníbal Acevedo Vilá tweeted using the hashtag "#GomezGotRobbed". Meanwhile, current Governor Alejandro García Padilla vowed to protest what he called a "theft" to the sport.

Shortly after the match, the three officers in charge of the match were suspended by United World Wrestling because of "suspicious officiating". They also claimed that an investigation would be done, but their decision couldn't be overturned. On September 3, 2016, it was announced that the three officers were officially expelled from the UWW, without offering the reasons for the expulsion.

Achievements 
 NCAA Division I title at 133 pounds (2009)
 Athlete of the Year at Michigan State University (2009)
 Silver medal at the World Wrestling Championship (2011)
 Gold medal at the 2011 Pan American Games in Guadalajara, Mexico (2011)
 Gold medal at the Grand Prix of Germany
 Gold medal at the 2014 Central American and Caribbean Games in Veracruz, Mexico (2014)

Freestyle record 

! colspan="7"| Senior Freestyle Matches
|-
!  Res.
!  Record
!  Opponent
!  Score
!  Date
!  Event
!  Location
|-
! style=background:white colspan=7 |
|-
|Loss
|114–46
|align=left| Mohammad naderi
|style="font-size:88%"|2–2
|style="font-size:88%"rowspan=5|December 7–8, 2017
|style="font-size:88%"rowspan=5|2017 Clubs World Cup
|style="text-align:left;font-size:88%;"rowspan=5|
 Tehran, Iran
|-
|Win
|114–45
|align=left| Lutbayar Batbayar
|style="font-size:88%"|5–3
|-
|Win
|113–45
|align=left| Miroslav Hristov
|style="font-size:88%"|13–4
|-
|Loss
|112–45
|align=left| Vinod Kumar
|style="font-size:88%"|5–6
|-
|Win
|112–44
|align=left| FF
|style="font-size:88%"|FF
|-
! style=background:white colspan=7 |
|-
|Loss
|111–44
|align=left| Alejandro Valdés
|style="font-size:88%"|2–11
|style="font-size:88%"rowspan=3|August 6, 2017
|style="font-size:88%"rowspan=3|2017 World Championships
|style="text-align:left;font-size:88%;"rowspan=3|
 Paris, France
|-
|Win
|111–43
|align=left| Gor Ogannesyan
|style="font-size:88%"|3–1
|-
|Win
|110–43
|align=left| Sixto Auccapiña
|style="font-size:88%"|8–0
|-
! style=background:white colspan=7 |
|-
|Win
|109–43
|align=left| Andres Castañeda
|style="font-size:88%"|8–5
|style="font-size:88%" rowspan=2|May 5–7, 2017
|style="font-size:88%" rowspan=2|2017 Pan American Continental Championships
|style="text-align:left;font-size:88%;" rowspan=2| Lauro de Freitas, Brazil
|-
|Win
|108–43
|align=left| Wilfredo Rodríguez
|style="font-size:88%"|TF 13–2
|-
! style=background:white colspan=7 |
|-
|Loss
|107–43
|align=left| Ikhtiyor Navruzov
|style="font-size:88%"|5–8
|style="font-size:88%" rowspan=2|August 21, 2016
|style="font-size:88%" rowspan=2|2016 Summer Olympics
|style="text-align:left;font-size:88%;" rowspan=2| Rio de Janeiro, Brazil
|-
|Win
|107–42
|align=left| Borislav Novachkov
|style="font-size:88%"|7–4
|-
! style=background:white colspan=7 |
|-
|Loss
|106–42
|align=left| Ganzorigiin Mandakhnaran
|style="font-size:88%"|1–5
|style="font-size:88%" rowspan=4|July 9–10, 2016
|style="font-size:88%" rowspan=4|2016 Grand Prix of Spain
|style="text-align:left;font-size:88%;" rowspan=4|
 Madrid, Spain
|-
|Win
|106–41
|align=left| Ivan Filippov
|style="font-size:88%"|2–0
|-
|Win
|105–41
|align=left| Ilyas Zhumay
|style="font-size:88%"|TF 10–0
|-
|Win
|104–41
|align=left| Kevin Henkel
|style="font-size:88%"|8–6
|-
! style=background:white colspan=7 |
|-
|Win
|103–41
|align=left| Yowlys Bonne
|style="font-size:88%"|
|style="font-size:88%" rowspan=2|June 10–14, 2016
|style="font-size:88%" rowspan=2|2016 Granma y Cerro Pelado International
|style="text-align:left;font-size:88%;" rowspan=2|
 Havana, Cuba
|-
|Win
|102–41
|align=left| Alejandro Valdés
|style="font-size:88%"|
|-
! style=background:white colspan=7 |
|-
|Loss
|101–41
|align=left| Alejandro Valdés
|style="font-size:88%"|3–8
|style="font-size:88%" rowspan=3|March 5, 2016
|style="font-size:88%" rowspan=3|2016 Pan American Olympic Qualification Tournament
|style="text-align:left;font-size:88%;" rowspan=3| Frisco, Texas
|-
|Win
|101–40
|align=left| Hernán Guzmán
|style="font-size:88%"|8–4
|-
|Win
|100–40
|align=left| Brent Metcalf
|style="font-size:88%"|9–7
|-
! style=background:white colspan=7 |
|-
|Loss
|99–40
|align=left| Haji Aliyev
|style="font-size:88%"|2–3
|style="font-size:88%" rowspan=2|February 5–7, 2016
|style="font-size:88%" rowspan=2|2016 Yasar Dogu International
|style="text-align:left;font-size:88%;" rowspan=2|
 Istanbul, Turkey
|-
|Win
|99–39
|align=left| Omer Uzan
|style="font-size:88%"|TF 12–0
|-
! style=background:white colspan=7 |
|-
|Win
|98–39
|align=left| Borislav Novachkov
|style="font-size:88%"|4–0
|style="font-size:88%" rowspan=3|January 29–31, 2016
|style="font-size:88%" rowspan=3|2016 Dan Kolov – Nikola Petrov International
|style="text-align:left;font-size:88%;" rowspan=3|
 Sofia, Bulgaria
|-
|Win
|97–39
|align=left| Mahdi Niazijengheshlaghi'nin
|style="font-size:88%"|TF 10–0
|-
|Win
|96–39
|align=left| Filip Novachkov
|style="font-size:88%"|7–1
|-
! style=background:white colspan=7 |
|-
|Loss
|95–39
|align=left| David Safaryan
|style="font-size:88%"|4–6
|style="font-size:88%" |September 10, 2015
|style="font-size:88%" |[2015 World Championships
|style="text-align:left;font-size:88%;" | Las Vegas, Nevada
|-
! style=background:white colspan=7 |
|-
|Win
|95–38
|align=left| Marbin Miranda
|style="font-size:88%"|TF 10–0
|style="font-size:88%" rowspan=3|July 17, 2015
|style="font-size:88%" rowspan=3|2015 Pan American Games
|style="text-align:left;font-size:88%;" rowspan=3| Toronto, Canada
|-
|Loss
|94–38
|align=left| Brent Metcalf
|style="font-size:88%"|8–10
|-
|Win
|94–37
|align=left| Wilfredo Henriquez
|style="font-size:88%"|TF 10–0
|-
! style=background:white colspan=7 |
|-
|Win
|93–37
|align=left| Alejandro Valdés
|style="font-size:88%"|TF 14–3
|style="font-size:88%" rowspan=3|October 20–24, 2014
|style="font-size:88%" rowspan=3|2014 Central American and Caribbean Games
|style="text-align:left;font-size:88%;" rowspan=3| Veracruz, Mexico
|-
|Win
|92–37
|align=left| Luis Portillo
|style="font-size:88%"|TF 10–0
|-
|Win
|91–37
|align=left| Elvis Fuentes
|style="font-size:88%"|TF 11–0
|-
! style=background:white colspan=7 |
|-
|Loss
|90–37
|align=left| Ganzorigiin Mandakhnaran
|style="font-size:88%"|4–7
|style="font-size:88%"rowspan=4|September 9, 2014
|style="font-size:88%"rowspan=4|2014 World Championships
|style="text-align:left;font-size:88%;"rowspan=4|
 Tashkent, Uzbekistan
|-
|Win
|90–36
|align=left| Christophe Clavier
|style="font-size:88%"|TF 13–0
|-
|Loss
|89–36
|align=left| Soslan Ramonov
|style="font-size:88%"|Fall
|-
|Win
|89–35
|align=left| Sayatbek Okassov
|style="font-size:88%"|5–1
|-
! style=background:white colspan=7 |
|-
|Loss
|88–35
|align=left| Akhmed Chakaev
|style="font-size:88%"|7–10
|style="font-size:88%" rowspan=3|July 19–20, 2014
|style="font-size:88%" rowspan=3|2014 Olympia Tournament
|style="text-align:left;font-size:88%;" rowspan=3| Olympia, Greece
|-
|Win
|88–34
|align=left| Zurabi Iakobishvili
|style="font-size:88%"|4–2
|-
|Win
|87–34
|align=left| Stelios Mama
|style="font-size:88%"|TF 10–0
|-
! style=background:white colspan=7 |
|-
|Win
|86–34
|align=left| Hernán Darío Guzmán Ipuz
|style="font-size:88%"|
|style="font-size:88%" rowspan=3|April 2–7, 2014
|style="font-size:88%" rowspan=3|2014 Central American and Caribbean Championships
|style="text-align:left;font-size:88%;" rowspan=3| San Juan, Puerto Rico
|-
|Win
|85–34
|align=left| Dayron Lazaro
|style="font-size:88%"|TF
|-
|Win
|84–34
|align=left| Brandon Díaz
|style="font-size:88%"|
|-
! style=background:white colspan=7 |
|-
|Win
|83–34
|align=left| Yiriken Ailixiati
|style="font-size:88%"|Fall
|style="font-size:88%" rowspan=4|February 21–23, 2014
|style="font-size:88%" rowspan=4|2014 Dan Kolov – Nikola Petrov International
|style="text-align:left;font-size:88%;" rowspan=4|
 Sofia, Bulgaria
|-
|Win
|82–34
|align=left| Selahattin Kılıçsallayan
|style="font-size:88%"|TF 12–0
|-
|Win
|81–34
|align=left| George Bucur
|style="font-size:88%"|TF 12–2
|-
|Win
|80–34
|align=left| Rafal Statkiewicz
|style="font-size:88%"|Fall
|-
! style=background:white colspan=7 |
|-
|Loss
|79–34
|align=left| Frank Molinaro
|style="font-size:88%"|1–1
|style="font-size:88%" rowspan=4|January 30 – February 1, 2014
|style="font-size:88%" rowspan=4|2014 Dave Schultz Memorial International Open
|style="text-align:left;font-size:88%;" rowspan=4|
 Colorado Springs, Colorado
|-
|Win
|79–33
|align=left| Borislav Novachkov
|style="font-size:88%"|8–2
|-
|Win
|78–33
|align=left| Drew Headlee
|style="font-size:88%"|TF 14–3
|-
|Win
|77–33
|align=left| Brett Robbins
|style="font-size:88%"|TF 14–4
|-
! style=background:white colspan=7 |
|-
|Loss
|76–33
|align=left| Artur Arakelyan
|style="font-size:88%"|4–6
|style="font-size:88%"rowspan=5|September 17, 2013
|style="font-size:88%"rowspan=5|2013 World Championships
|style="text-align:left;font-size:88%;"rowspan=5|
 Budapest, Hungary
|-
|Win
|76–32
|align=left| Andrei Prepeliţă
|style="font-size:88%"|5–1
|-
|Loss
|75–32
|align=left| Bekkhan Goygereyev
|style="font-size:88%"|5–13
|-
|Win
|75–31
|align=left| Hwang Ryon-ghak
|style="font-size:88%"|8–6
|-
|Win
|74–31
|align=left| Bazar Bazarguruev
|style="font-size:88%"|Fall
|-
! style=background:white colspan=7 |
|-
|Win
|73–31
|align=left| Krzysztof Bienkowski
|style="font-size:88%"|8–0
|style="font-size:88%" |August 10, 2013
|style="font-size:88%" |2013 Poland Open
|style="text-align:left;font-size:88%;" | Spala, Poland
|-
! style=background:white colspan=7 |
|-
|Win
|72–31
|align=left| Nikolai Bolotnyuk
|style="font-size:88%"|5–0
|style="font-size:88%" rowspan=3|July 13, 2013
|style="font-size:88%" rowspan=3|2013 Grand Prix of Spain
|style="text-align:left;font-size:88%;" rowspan=3|
 Madrid, Spain
|-
|Win
|71–31
|align=left|
|style="font-size:88%"|
|-
|Win
|70–31
|align=left|
|style="font-size:88%"|
|-
! style=background:white colspan=7 |
|-
|Loss
|69–31
|align=left| Vladimer Khinchegashvili
|style="font-size:88%"|
|style="font-size:88%" |May 31, 2013
|style="font-size:88%" |2013 FILA Golden Grand Prix
|style="text-align:left;font-size:88%;" | Sassari, Italy
|-
! style=background:white colspan=7 |
|-
|Loss
|69–30
|align=left| Vladimir Flegontov
|style="font-size:88%"|2–4, 1–0, 1–2
|style="font-size:88%" |January 24, 2013
|style="font-size:88%" |2013 Ivan Yarygin Golden Grand Prix
|style="text-align:left;font-size:88%;" | Krasnoyarsk, Russia
|-
! style=background:white colspan=7 |
|-
|Loss
|69–29
|align=left| Yogeshwar Dutt
|style="font-size:88%"|0–1, 0–1
|style="font-size:88%" rowspan=2|August 11, 2012
|style="font-size:88%" rowspan=2|2012 Summer Olympics
|style="text-align:left;font-size:88%;" rowspan=2| London, England
|-
|Loss
|69–28
|align=left| Besik Kudukhov
|style="font-size:88%"|2–2, 0–1, 0–1
|-
! style=background:white colspan=7 |
|-
|Win
|69–27
|align=left| Besik Kudukhov
|style="font-size:88%"|
|style="font-size:88%"|June 30, 2012
|style="font-size:88%"|2012 Grand Prix of Germany
|style="text-align:left;font-size:88%;"|
 Dortmund, Germany
|-
! style=background:white colspan=7 |
|-
|Win
|69–27
|align=left| Salvatore Mannino
|style="font-size:88%"|
|style="font-size:88%"|June 2, 2012
|style="font-size:88%"|2012 Torneo Citta a Sassari
|style="text-align:left;font-size:88%;"|
 Sassari, Italy
|-
! style=background:white colspan=7 |
|-
|Win
|68–27
|align=left| Andrei Dukov
|style="font-size:88%"|
|style="font-size:88%"|May 25, 2012
|style="font-size:88%"|2012 Ion Corneanu Memorial
|style="text-align:left;font-size:88%;"|
 Targoviste, Romania
|-
! style=background:white colspan=7 |
|-
|Win
|67–27
|align=left| Guillermo Torres
|style="font-size:88%"|3–0, 6–0
|style="font-size:88%" rowspan=3|October 20–24, 2011
|style="font-size:88%" rowspan=3|2011 Pan American Games
|style="text-align:left;font-size:88%;" rowspan=3| Guadalajara, Mexico
|-
|Win
|66–27
|align=left| Yowlys Bonne
|style="font-size:88%"|2–0, 3–0
|-
|Win
|65–27
|align=left| Gabriel García
|style="font-size:88%"|4–0, 4–0
|-
! style=background:white colspan=7 |
|-
|Loss
|64–27
|align=left| Besik Kudukhov
|style="font-size:88%"|0–5, 0–1
|style="font-size:88%"rowspan=6|September 17, 2011
|style="font-size:88%"rowspan=6|2011 World Championships
|style="text-align:left;font-size:88%;"rowspan=6|
 Istanbul, Turkey
|-
|Win
|63–26
|align=left| Dauren Zhumagaziyev
|style="font-size:88%"|1–1, 0–1, 3–0
|-
|Win
|62–26
|align=left| Zelimkhan Huseynov
|style="font-size:88%"|0–1, 1–0, 2–1
|-
|Win
|61–26
|align=left| Lee Seung-chul
|style="font-size:88%"|2–0, 3–0
|-
|Win
|60–26
|align=left| Ri Jong-myong
|style="font-size:88%"|1–0, 3–0
|-
|Win
|59–26
|align=left| Malkhaz Zarkua
|style="font-size:88%"|4–0, 2–0
|-
! style=background:white colspan=7 |
|-
|Win
|58–26
|align=left| Tim Schleicher
|style="font-size:88%"|
|style="font-size:88%"|July 7, 2011
|style="font-size:88%"|2011 Grand Prix of Spain
|style="text-align:left;font-size:88%;"|
 Madrid, Spain
|-
! style=background:white colspan=7 |
|-
|Win
|57–26
|align=left| Ryley Walker
|style="font-size:88%"|
|style="font-size:88%"|May 6, 2011
|style="font-size:88%"|2011 Pan American Continental Championships
|style="text-align:left;font-size:88%;"|
 Rionegro, Colombia
|-
|Win
|56–26
|align=left| Derek Moore
|style="font-size:88%"|2–0, 5–0
|style="font-size:88%"|March 17, 2011
|style="font-size:88%"|2011 NCAA vs. USAW National Team All-Star Dual
|style="text-align:left;font-size:88%;" |
 Philadelphia, Pennsylvania
|-
! style=background:white colspan=7 |
|-
|Win
|55–26
|align=left| Nick Simmons
|style="font-size:88%"|2–1, 1–0
|style="font-size:88%" rowspan=6|February 2–5, 2011
|style="font-size:88%" rowspan=6|2011 Dave Schultz Memorial International Open
|style="text-align:left;font-size:88%;" rowspan=6|
 Colorado Springs, Colorado
|-
|Win
|54–26
|align=left| Reece Humphrey
|style="font-size:88%"|7–0, 0–1, 3–0
|-
|Win
|53–26
|align=left| Coleman Scott
|style="font-size:88%"|1–0, 1–1
|-
|Win
|52–26
|align=left| Nick Fanthorpe
|style="font-size:88%"|3–0, 1–0
|-
|Loss
|51–26
|align=left| Shogo Maeda
|style="font-size:88%"|6–0, 0–1, 1–4
|-
|Win
|51–25
|align=left| Alan Olvera
|style="font-size:88%"|TF 6–0, 6–0
|-
! style=background:white colspan=7 |
|-
|Loss
|50–25
|align=left| Reece Humphrey
|style="font-size:88%"|0–1, 0–1
|style="font-size:88%" rowspan=4|November 20–21, 2010
|style="font-size:88%" rowspan=4|2010 Sunkist Kids International Open
|style="text-align:left;font-size:88%;" rowspan=4|
 New York, New York
|-
|Loss
|50–24
|align=left| Rasul Murtazaliev
|style="font-size:88%"|3–5, 0–2
|-
|Win
|50–23
|align=left| Derek Moore
|style="font-size:88%"|1–1, 4–0
|-
|Win
|49–23
|align=left| James Mancini
|style="font-size:88%"|Fall
|-
! style=background:white colspan=7 |
|-
|Win
|48–23
|align=left| Steve Mytych
|style="font-size:88%"|1–0, 2–3, 1–0
|style="font-size:88%" rowspan=5|October 22–24, 2010
|style="font-size:88%" rowspan=5|2010 Sunkist Kids International Open
|style="text-align:left;font-size:88%;" rowspan=5|
 Tempe, Arizona
|-
|Loss
|47–23
|align=left| Seshito Shimizu
|style="font-size:88%"|Fall
|-
|Win
|47–22
|align=left| Craig Barker
|style="font-size:88%"|7–0, 4–0
|-
|Win
|46–22
|align=left| Marcus Pettis
|style="font-size:88%"|4–0, 7–0
|-
|Loss
|45–22
|align=left| Drew Headlee
|style="font-size:88%"|0–1, 0–1
|-
! style=background:white colspan=7 |
|-
|Loss
|45–21
|align=left| Malkhaz Kurdiani
|style="font-size:88%"|2–2, 0–2
|style="font-size:88%"|September 11, 2010
|style="font-size:88%"|2010 World Championships
|style="text-align:left;font-size:88%;"|
 Moscow, Russia
|-
! style=background:white colspan=7 |
|-
|Win
|45–20
|align=left| Daryl Thomas
|style="font-size:88%"|Fall
|style="font-size:88%" rowspan=4|May 15–16, 2009
|style="font-size:88%" rowspan=4|2009 US Northeast Regional Championships
|style="text-align:left;font-size:88%;" rowspan=4|
 Waterloo, Iowa
|-
|Win
|44–20
|align=left| Nick Trizzino
|style="font-size:88%"|3–0, 7–0
|-
|Loss
|43–20
|align=left| Daniel Dennis
|style="font-size:88%"|0–1, 2–0, 0–1
|-
|Win
|43–19
|align=left| Daryl Thomas
|style="font-size:88%"|8–1, 1–0
|-
! style=background:white colspan=7 |
|-
|Win
|42–19
|align=left| Dylan Long
|style="font-size:88%"|7–0, 3–0
|style="font-size:88%" rowspan=9|April 24–26, 2009
|style="font-size:88%" rowspan=9|2009 US University National Championships
|style="text-align:left;font-size:88%;" rowspan=9|
 Akron, Ohio
|-
|Win
|41–19
|align=left| Daniel Mitcheff
|style="font-size:88%"|1–1, 6–0
|-
|Win
|40–19
|align=left| Conor Beebe
|style="font-size:88%"|4–2, 4–2
|-
|Win
|39–19
|align=left| Jimmy Conror
|style="font-size:88%"|2–0, 3–0
|-
|Win
|38–19
|align=left| Jayson Ness
|style="font-size:88%"|5–1, 1–3, 2–1
|-
|Win
|37–19
|align=left| Quinton Leith
|style="font-size:88%"|TF 6–0, 7–0
|-
|Loss
|36–19
|align=left| Coleman Scott
|style="font-size:88%"|0–4, 1–2
|-
|Win
|36–18
|align=left| Nikkien Fauntleroy
|style="font-size:88%"|TF 7–1, 7–1
|-
|Win
|35–18
|align=left| Brian Marcoux
|style="font-size:88%"|TF 6–0, 6–0
|-
! style=background:white colspan=7 |
|-
|Loss
|34–18
|align=left| Drew Headlee
|style="font-size:88%"|0–1, 4–3, 0–4
|style="font-size:88%" rowspan=3|April 9–11, 2009
|style="font-size:88%" rowspan=3|2009 US National Championships
|style="text-align:left;font-size:88%;" rowspan=3|
 Las Vegas, Nevada
|-
|Win
|34–17
|align=left| Teague Moore
|style="font-size:88%"|4–0, 0–1, 0–7
|-
|Loss
|33–17
|align=left| Tyler Graff
|style="font-size:88%"|0–3, 1–0, 0–1
|-
! style=background:white colspan=7 |
|-
|Loss
|33–16
|align=left| Reece Humphrey
|style="font-size:88%"|0–1, 0–1
|style="font-size:88%" rowspan=2|May 24, 2008
|style="font-size:88%" rowspan=2|2008 US University World Team Trials
|style="text-align:left;font-size:88%;" rowspan=2|
 Colorado
|-
|Win
|33–15
|align=left| Drew Headlee
|style="font-size:88%"|3–0, 3–7, 2–0
|-
! style=background:white colspan=7 |
|-
|Loss
|32–15
|align=left| Angel Cejudo
|style="font-size:88%"|1–1, 1–1
|style="font-size:88%" rowspan=3|May 10, 2008
|style="font-size:88%" rowspan=3|2008 US Northeast Regional Championships
|style="text-align:left;font-size:88%;" rowspan=3|
 Iowa
|-
|Win
|32–14
|align=left| Jayson Ness
|style="font-size:88%"|1–1, 0–4, 2–1
|-
|Win
|31–14
|align=left| Ben Hanisch
|style="font-size:88%"|6–0, 3–0
|-
! style=background:white colspan=7 |
|-
|Loss
|30–14
|align=left| Drew Headlee
|style="font-size:88%"|2–3, 0–6
|style="font-size:88%" rowspan=8|April 26, 2008
|style="font-size:88%" rowspan=4|2008 US National Championships
|style="text-align:left;font-size:88%;" rowspan=8|
 Nevada
|-
|Loss
|30–13
|align=left| Dylan Long
|style="font-size:88%"|4–0, 0–1, 0–7
|-
|Win
|30–12
|align=left| Alex Tsirtsis
|style="font-size:88%"|1–1, 2–0, 1–0
|-
|Loss
|29–12
|align=left| Michael Lightner
|style="font-size:88%"|0–3, 1–3
|-
|Win
|29–11
|align=left| Tyler Graff
|style="font-size:88%"|6–0, 4–2
|style="font-size:88%" rowspan=4|2008 US National Championships (qualifiers)
|-
|Loss
|28–11
|align=left| Dylan Long
|style="font-size:88%"|2–3, 0–2
|-
|Win
|28–10
|align=left| Melvin Lofton
|style="font-size:88%"|1–1, 2–0, 4–1
|-
|Win
|27–10
|align=left| Drew Headlee
|style="font-size:88%"|2–1, 1–0
|-
! style=background:white colspan=7 |
|-
|Loss
|26–10
|align=left| Daniel Dennis
|style="font-size:88%"|0–3, 0–3
|style="font-size:88%" rowspan=6|April 13, 2008
|style="font-size:88%" rowspan=6|2008 US University National Championships
|style="text-align:left;font-size:88%;" rowspan=6|
 Ohio
|-
|Win
|26–9
|align=left| Alex Tsirtsis
|style="font-size:88%"|4–1, 0–1, 3–1
|-
|Win
|25–9
|align=left| Chris Jenkins
|style="font-size:88%"|7–0, 1–0
|-
|Win
|24–9
|align=left| Ben Hanisch
|style="font-size:88%"|TF 6–0, 6–0
|-
|Win
|23–9
|align=left| Dalton Bullard
|style="font-size:88%"|1–0, 6–0
|-
|Win
|22–9
|align=left| Matthew Fisk
|style="font-size:88%"|7–0, 1–1
|-
! style=background:white colspan=7 |
|-
|Loss
|21–9
|align=left| Josh Keefe
|style="font-size:88%"|2–0, 2–3, 0–3
|style="font-size:88%" rowspan=3|July 10, 2007
|style="font-size:88%" rowspan=3|2007 US World Team Trials
|style="text-align:left;font-size:88%;" rowspan=3|
 Nevada
|-
|Loss
|21–8
|align=left| Shawn Bunch
|style="font-size:88%"|0–1, 3–4
|-
|Win
|21–7
|align=left| Eric Metzler
|style="font-size:88%"|4–0, 3–0
|-
! style=background:white colspan=7 |
|-
|Win
|20–7
|align=left| Mike Grey
|style="font-size:88%"|7–3, 7–3
|style="font-size:88%" rowspan=7|April 22, 2007
|style="font-size:88%" rowspan=7|2007 US University National Championships
|style="text-align:left;font-size:88%;" rowspan=7|
 Ohio
|-
|Loss
|19–7
|align=left| Javier Maldonado
|style="font-size:88%"|0–1, 2–3
|-
|Win
|19–6
|align=left| Terry Williams
|style="font-size:88%"|4–1, 1–1, 1–0
|-
|Loss
|18–6
|align=left| Josh Keefe
|style="font-size:88%"|0–5, 1–2
|-
|Win
|18–5
|align=left| Brent Clausing
|style="font-size:88%"|5–0, 4–0
|-
|Win
|17–5
|align=left| Francisco Manriquez
|style="font-size:88%"|2–0, 7–0
|-
|Win
|16–5
|align=left| Evan Forde
|style="font-size:88%"|TF 7–0, 7–0
|-
! style=background:white colspan=7 |
|-
|Loss
|15–5
|align=left| Joey Rivera
|style="font-size:88%"|1–3, 5–3, 2–5
|style="font-size:88%" rowspan=7|April 7, 2007
|style="font-size:88%" rowspan=2|2007 US National Championships
|style="text-align:left;font-size:88%;" rowspan=7|
 Nevada
|-
|Loss
|15–4
|align=left| Mike Zadick
|style="font-size:88%"|TF 0–7, 0–7
|-
|Win
|15–3
|align=left| Travis Drake
|style="font-size:88%"|1–1, 5–1
|style="font-size:88%" rowspan=5|2007 US National Championships (qualifiers)
|-
|Win
|14–3
|align=left| Bryan Osuna
|style="font-size:88%"|3–0, 6–0
|-
|Win
|13–3
|align=left| Josh Keefe
|style="font-size:88%"|6–0, 1–4, 4–3
|-
|Win
|12–3
|align=left| Angel Alegre
|style="font-size:88%"|TF 8–0, 6–0
|-
|Loss
|11–3
|align=left| Danny Felix
|style="font-size:88%"|0–1, 0–1
|-
! style=background:white colspan=7 |
|-
|Win
|11–2
|align=left| Danny Felix
|style="font-size:88%"|1–0, 1–0
|style="font-size:88%" rowspan=4|March 25, 2007
|style="font-size:88%" rowspan=4|2007 US Northeast Regional Championships
|style="text-align:left;font-size:88%;" rowspan=4|
 New York
|-
|Win
|10–2
|align=left| Jason Guffey
|style="font-size:88%"|TF 7–0, 6–0
|-
|Win
|9–2
|align=left| Michael Watts
|style="font-size:88%"|TF 8–0, 7–0
|-
|Win
|8–2
|align=left| Rob Labrake
|style="font-size:88%"|4–2, 7–0
|-
! style=background:white colspan=7 |
|-
|Loss
|7–2
|align=left| Matt Azevedo
|style="font-size:88%"|1–8, 0–2
|style="font-size:88%" rowspan=5|May 28, 2006
|style="font-size:88%" rowspan=5|2006 US World Team Trials
|style="text-align:left;font-size:88%;" rowspan=5|
 Iowa
|-
|Win
|7–1
|align=left| Adam Smith
|style="font-size:88%"|Fall
|-
|Win
|6–1
|align=left| Michael Martinez
|style="font-size:88%"|1–0, 3–5, 2–2
|-
|Loss
|5–1
|align=left| Henry Cejudo
|style="font-size:88%"|1–0, 1–2, 1–3
|-
|Win
|5–0
|align=left| Luke Smith
|style="font-size:88%"|4–2, 7–0
|-
! style=background:white colspan=7 |
|-
|Win
|4–0
|align=left| Luke Smith
|style="font-size:88%"|3–0, 3–0
|style="font-size:88%" rowspan=4|April 30, 2006
|style="font-size:88%" rowspan=4|2006 US University National Championships
|style="text-align:left;font-size:88%;" rowspan=4|
 Illinois
|-
|Win
|3–0
|align=left| Brad Pataky
|style="font-size:88%"|3–0, 5–0
|-
|Win
|2–0
|align=left| Tim Kephart
|style="font-size:88%"|3–0, 6–0
|-
|Win
|1–0
|align=left| Chris Heilman
|style="font-size:88%"|TF 6–0, 7–0
|-

References

External links
 
 
 
 

1986 births
Living people
Puerto Rican male sport wrestlers
Wrestlers at the 2011 Pan American Games
Wrestlers at the 2012 Summer Olympics
Olympic wrestlers of Puerto Rico
World Wrestling Championships medalists
Pan American Games gold medalists for Puerto Rico
Pan American Games bronze medalists for Puerto Rico
Pan American Games medalists in wrestling
Wrestlers at the 2015 Pan American Games
Central American and Caribbean Games gold medalists for Puerto Rico
Central American and Caribbean Games bronze medalists for Puerto Rico
Competitors at the 2010 Central American and Caribbean Games
Competitors at the 2014 Central American and Caribbean Games
Wrestlers at the 2019 Pan American Games
Central American and Caribbean Games medalists in wrestling
Medalists at the 2015 Pan American Games
Medalists at the 2019 Pan American Games
Medalists at the 2011 Pan American Games
Pan American Wrestling Championships medalists
Wrestlers at the 2016 Summer Olympics
Wrestlers at the 2020 Summer Olympics
St. Augustine Preparatory School alumni